China National Highway 105 (G105) runs from Beijing to Macau SAR, via Langfang, Chuangzhou, Dezhou, Donge, Jining, Shuangyou, Fuyang, Liuan, Jiujiang, Nanchang, Ji'an, Guangzhou and Zhuhai. It runs to approximately 2,717 km, and, on a map, runs broadly on a straight line from Beijing to Guangzhou.

Through the Lotus Bridge it is connected to Macau, this section has been selected to extend the G105 in 2013, under a new 2013-2030 plan by NDRC&MoT.

Route and distance

See also
 China National Highways

References

105
Road transport in Beijing
Transport in Hebei
Road transport in Tianjin
Transport in Shandong
Transport in Henan
Transport in Anhui
Transport in Hubei
Transport in Jiangxi
Transport in Guangdong
Zhuhai